Dedeler is a village in Tarsus district of Mersin Province, Turkey. It is close to Eshabıkehf, the cave of Seven Sleepers, which is considered as a pilgrimage center by some. The population of village is 821 as of 2011.

References

Villages in Tarsus District